The 1995–96 Slovak Cup was the 27th season of Slovakia's annual knock-out cup competition and the third since the independence of Slovakia. It was ended on 26 May 1996 with the Final. The winners of the competition earned a place in the qualifying round of the UEFA Cup Winners' Cup. Inter Bratislava were the defending champions.

First round

|}

Second round

|}
Source:

Quarter-finals

|}
Sources: ,

Semi-finals

|}
Source:

Final

References

External links
profutbal.sk 
Results on RSSSF

Slovak Cup seasons
Slovak Cup
Cup